Bolovăniș may refer to the following places in Romania:

 Bolovăniș, a village in the commune Ghimeș-Făget, Bacău County
 Bolovăniș, a tributary of the Neagra Broștenilor in Harghita County
 Bolovăniș (Tarcău), a tributary of the Tarcău in Neamț County 
 Bolovăniș, a tributary of the Trotuș in Bacău County

See also 
 Bolovan (disambiguation)